The Eagleton Terrace are heritage-listed terrace houses located at 67–73 Lower Fort Street, in the inner city Sydney suburb of Millers Point in the City of Sydney local government area of New South Wales, Australia. The property was added to the New South Wales State Heritage Register on 2 April 1999.

History 
Millers Point is one of the earliest areas of European settlement in Australia, and a focus for maritime activities. This building was constructed during the mid 1860s as one of a group of four terrace houses. First tenanted by the NSW Department of Housing in 1984.

Description 
Two storey, five bedroom, early Victorian terrace with basement and attic. Cast iron lace balcony and infilled verandah. Skylight to attic. Storeys: Two; Construction: Painted rendered masonry, slate roof, cast iron lace, spear fence. Painted timber work. Style: Victorian Filigree.

The external condition of the property is good.

Modifications and dates 
External: Timber work modified. Dormers have been removed. Some verandah infil.

Heritage listing 
As at 23 November 2000, this property is part of a group of early Victorian terraces.

It is part of the Millers Point Conservation Area, an intact residential and maritime precinct. It contains residential buildings and civic spaces dating from the 1830s and is an important example of 19th century adaptation of the landscape.

Eagleton Terrace was listed on the New South Wales State Heritage Register on 2 April 1999.

See also 

Australian residential architectural styles
Vermont Terrace, 63-65 Lower Fort Street
75-77 Lower Fort Street

References

Bibliography

Attribution

External links

 
 

New South Wales State Heritage Register sites located in Millers Point
Houses in Millers Point, New South Wales
Terraced houses in Sydney
Articles incorporating text from the New South Wales State Heritage Register
1860 establishments in Australia
Houses completed in 1860
Millers Point Conservation Area